Patna and Dalrymple was one of 32 electoral wards of East Ayrshire Council. Originally created in 1974, the ward was initially within Cumnock and Doon Valley District Council before the local government reforms in the 1990s. The ward elected one councillor using the first-past-the-post voting electoral system.

The ward was a Labour stronghold as the party successfully held the seat at every election after gaining it from independent T. Hainey in 1984 until it was abolished.

In 2007, the ward was abolished and replaced by the multi-member Doon Valley ward as council elections moved to a proportional voting system – the single transferable vote – following the implementation of the Local Governance (Scotland) Act 2004.

Boundaries
The Patna and Dalrymple ward was created in 1974 by the Formation Electoral Arrangements from the previous Dalmellington North and Dalrymple electoral divisions of Ayr County Council excluding the part which lay within the Parish of Ayr. The ward centered around the towns of Patna and Dalrymple and took in the western part of Cumnock and Doon Valley next to its border with Kyle and Carrick District Council. The ward's eastern boundary was moved west closer to Dalrymple when part of Cumnock and Doon Valley district was transferred to Kyle and Carrick following a review of into the Coylton, Dalrymple and Mosshill Industrial Estate areas in 1977. The boundaries then remained largely unchanged following the Initial Statutory Reviews of Electoral Arrangements in 1981 and the Second Statutory Reviews of Electoral Arrangements in 1994. After the implementation of the Local Government etc. (Scotland) Act 1994, the boundaries proposed by the second review became the Formation Electoral Arrangements for the newly created East Ayrshire Council – an amalgamation of Cumnock and Doon Valley District Council and Kilmarnock and Loudoun District Council. In 1998, the Third Statutory Reviews of Electoral Arrangements straightened the boundary to the east of Patna to include an area of farmland ahead of the 1999 election. In 2007, the ward was abolished as the Local Governance (Scotland) Act 2004 saw proportional representation and new multi-member wards introduced. The area covered by the Patna and Dalrymple ward was placed into the new Doon Valley ward.

Councillors

Election results

2003 election

1999 election

1995 election

1992 election

1988 election

1984 election

1980 election

1977 election

1974 election

References

Wards of East Ayrshire
Elections in Scotland
Politics of Scotland